Daniel Hector Bouchard  (born December 12, 1950) is a Canadian former professional ice hockey goaltender. He played in the National Hockey League (NHL) with the Atlanta Flames, Calgary Flames, Quebec Nordiques, and original Winnipeg Jets.

Career
Bouchard played in the 1962 and 1963 Quebec International Pee-Wee Hockey Tournaments with his LaSalle youth team. As a junior, Bouchard backstopped the Sorel Black Hawks to the 1969 Memorial Cup. Bouchard was drafted by the Boston Bruins in 1970, and after two years in the American Hockey League, made his NHL debut in 1972–73 after the Flames claimed him in the 1972 NHL Expansion Draft. After eight seasons in Atlanta, the Flames franchise relocated to Calgary, Alberta in the summer of 1980. Halfway through the 1980–81 season, Bouchard was traded to the Quebec Nordiques for Jamie Hislop; at the time of the trade, Bouchard was the last original Atlanta Flames player still with the organization. He then led Quebec to their first playoff appearance since the 1979 NHL–WHA merger.

The following season was a magical one as the Nordiques lost in the Wales Conference Final to the defending champion New York Islanders, who would go on to win their third straight Stanley Cup. Along the way, Quebec disposed of the Montreal Canadiens, their most bitter rival, and then Boston in a pair of thrilling series. Each went down to the wire in the final game, but Quebec held on to win. In the 1985–86 season he was traded to the Winnipeg Jets, where he left the NHL after losing in the opening round to the Calgary Flames. He played 7 games for HC Fribourg-Gottéron in the 1986–87 season before a knee injury forced his retirement.

Current life
Bouchard currently lives in Atlanta, Georgia, where he privately trains goalies and serves as the head goalie coach at The Cooler for the Atlanta Fire Team.

Career statistics

Regular season and playoffs

References

External links

1950 births
Living people
Atlanta Flames players
Boston Braves (AHL) players
Boston Bruins draft picks
Calgary Flames players
Canadian ice hockey goaltenders
HC Fribourg-Gottéron players
Hershey Bears players
Ice hockey people from Quebec
London Knights players
Oklahoma City Blazers (1965–1977) players
People from Val-d'Or
Quebec Nordiques players
Sorel Éperviers players
Winnipeg Jets (1979–1996) players
Canadian expatriate ice hockey players in Switzerland
Canadian expatriate ice hockey players in the United States